Jennifer Ferrin (born February 25, 1979) is an American actress.

Early life and education
Ferrin was born in Lawrenceville, Georgia. She attended Brookwood High where she was the lead in many high school plays and was a member of the choir. Upon her graduation from high school, Ferrin attended the College of Charleston in Charleston, South Carolina and the North Carolina School of the Arts in Winston-Salem, North Carolina, where she graduated with a Bachelor of Fine Arts in drama.

Career
Ferrin played the younger version of Vanessa Redgrave's character Esther in the Hallmark Hall of Fame film The Locket. She guest starred in the 2002 season finale of Dawson's Creek. Ferrin's most notable role to date is that of Jennifer Munson Kasnoff Donovan on the daytime soap opera As the World Turns, played from 2003 to 2006. She was nominated twice for a Daytime Emmy Award.

In 2006, she landed a recurring role on the primetime show 3 lbs. Ferrin was one of the four actors starring in the U.S. premiere productions of The 39 Steps, Patrick Barlow's stage adaptation of the Alfred Hitchcock film, in Boston in 2007 and New York in 2008

Ferrin also played Detective Sam Tyler's mother in the American version of Life On Mars. In January 2011, she began her role of Dana Faraday on the NBC superhero drama series The Cape. She also had a two episode stint on Royal Pains and was recurring character Molly on The Following. She portrayed Rebecca Mason, the deceased wife of lead character Tom Mason (Noah Wyle), in a dream episode of the TNT science-fiction drama series Falling Skies, on July 21, 2013; Ferrin appeared again on Falling Skies for the series' fifth-season premiere on June 28, 2015.

She became a series regular in the third season of AMC's Hell on Wheels.

In Steven Soderbergh's Mosaic, a murder mystery released in 2017 as an interactive iOS/Android app and then in 2018 as an HBO television drama, Ferrin played Petra Neill, a point-of-view character.
She also was in ABCs cancelled time travel series Time After Time where she played a doctor trying to develop her father's research further.

As of 2021, she began a recurring role on CBS' The Equalizer, playing Avery Grafton, a DA who is determined to seek out and stop Robyn McCall's vigilantism as it also threatens her political future.

Personal life
Ferrin is married to interior designer Zachary Bliss, whom she met in 2009 and wed in 2014. The couple reside in Amagansett, New York.

Filmography

Film

Television

References

External links
JenniferFerrin.net

1979 births
Living people
American film actresses
College of Charleston alumni
University of North Carolina School of the Arts alumni
People from Lawrenceville, Georgia
American television actresses
American soap opera actresses
Actresses from Georgia (U.S. state)
21st-century American actresses